The Clausura 2016 Liga MX championship stage commonly known as liguilla (mini league) was being played from May 11, 2016 to May 29, 2016. A total of eight teams were competing in the championship stage to decide the champions of the Clausura 2016 Liga MX season. Both finalists qualified to the 2016–17 CONCACAF Champions League.

Qualified teams

Format
Teams are re-seeded each round.
Team with more goals on aggregate after two matches advances.
Away goals rule is applied in the quarterfinals and semifinals, but not the final.
In the quarterfinals and semifinals, if the two teams are tied on aggregate and away goals, the higher seeded team advances.
In the final, if the two teams are tied after both legs, the match goes to extra time and, if necessary, a shoot-out.
Both finalists qualify to the 2016–17 CONCACAF Champions League (in Pot 3).

Bracket

Quarterfinals

All times are UTC−6

First leg

Second leg

Monterrey won 4–3 on aggregate

León won 5–2 on aggregate

América won 2–1 on aggregate

Pachuca won 4–3 on aggregate

Semifinals

First leg

Second leg

Monterrey won 4–3 on aggregate

Pachuca won 3–2 on aggregate

Final

First leg

Second leg

Pachuca won 2–1 on aggregate

Goalscorers
3 goals
 Franco Jara (Pachuca)
 Luis Montes (León)

2 goals
 Michael Arroyo (América)
 Edwin Cardona (Monterrey)
 Rogelio Funes Mori (Monterrey)
 Diego González (Santos Laguna)
 Elías Hernández (León)
 Hirving Lozano (Pachuca)
 Osvaldo Martínez (América)
 Carlos Sánchez (Monterrey)
 Rafael Sóbis (UANL)
 Jonathan Urretaviscaya (Pachuca)

1 goal
 Mauro Boselli (León)
 Jesús Dueñas (UANL)
 Víctor Guzmán (Pachuca)
 Rodrigo Millar (Morelia)
 César Montes (Monterrey)
 Dorlan Pabón (Monterrey)
 Cristian Pellerano (Morelia)
 Oribe Peralta (América)
 Orbelín Pineda (Guadalajara)
 Andrés Rentería (Santos Laguna)
 Aldo Rocha (León)

Own goals
 Diego Novaretti (against Pachuca)

References

External links
Liga MX website

 
1
Liga MX seasons